"Identified" is the pilot and first episode of UFO, a 1970 British television science fiction series about an alien invasion of Earth. The screenplay was written by Gerry Anderson, Sylvia Anderson and Tony Barwick; the director was Gerry Anderson. The episode was filmed between 28 April and 12 May 1969, and aired on ATV Midlands on 16 September 1970.

The series was created by Gerry and Sylvia Anderson with Reg Hill, and produced by the Andersons and Lew Grade's Century 21 Productions for Grade's ITC Entertainment company.

Story

Two women and man come across a UFO that has landed in a wood. The man, Peter Carlin (Peter Gordeno), starts filming the craft but the threesome are fired upon by the alien occupants. One of the women is killed, Carlin is shot and injured whilst the third, Carlin's sister, is abducted.

Increasing UFO activity, starting in 1970, brings (as shown in the episode "Confetti Check A-O.K.") the United States, the Soviet Union, the United Kingdom, France and West Germany together to combat the perceived threat. Whilst en route to a secret meeting with the British Prime Minister, Col. Ed Straker (Ed Bishop) and General Henderson's (Grant Taylor) Rolls-Royce Phantom VI and two escort police motorbikes are attacked by a UFO. Straker is thrown clear but Henderson is seriously wounded.

After ten years of planning the international community has paid for the construction of a secret organisation – SHADO (the Supreme Headquarters, Alien Defence Organisation) – in Britain to track and deal with any incoming UFO threats. Straker is now in command of this organisation. SHADO is hidden beneath Harlington-Straker, a working film studio used as cover for the underground base. Straker's cover involves being a film producer.

Following a fire at Westbrook Electronics, Colonel Freeman (George Sewell) is piloting a transporter aircraft from Los Angeles which contains top secret Utronic equipment to track UFOs in deep space, plus its creator Col. Virginia Lake. SID, the Space Intruder Detector (an early warning computerised tracking satellite that detects incoming alien UFOs), detects an approaching UFO heading for the North Atlantic. Moonbase launches three interceptors which fire upon the UFO but it manages to escape destruction. SHADO control authorise Skydiver submarine to launch Sky One interceptor aircraft piloted by Capt. Peter Carlin. The UFO continues into Earth's atmosphere and tracks and fires at the transporter, but is shot down by Sky One. The UFO disintegrates in the sea.

An injured alien occupant survives the UFO crash and is examined at SHADO's medical laboratory. The effects of Earth's atmosphere cause the alien to revert to his true age and die. Following an autopsy, SHADO discover that the alien has numerous organ transplants harvested from humans. It transpires that the alien's heart comes from Carlin's sister, who disappeared in the 1970 UFO incident shown at the beginning.

Cast

Starring
 Ed Bishop – Commander Edward Straker
 George Sewell – Col. Alec E. Freeman
 Gabrielle Drake – Lt. Gay Ellis
 Wanda Ventham – Col. Virginia Lake
 Peter Gordeno – Capt. Peter Carlin
 Dolores Mantez – Lt. Nina Barry
 Gary Myers— Capt. Lew Waterman
 Keith Alexander— Lt. Keith Ford
 Ayshea – Lt. Ayshea Johnson
 Norma Ronald – Miss Ealand

Also Starring
 Grant Taylor – Gen. James L. Henderson
 Shane Rimmer – Lt. Bill Johnson

Featuring
 Basil Dignam – Cabinet Minister	
 Maxwell Shaw – Dr. Shroeder	
 Michael Mundell – Lt. Ken Matthews	
 Paul Gillard – Kurt Mahler	
 Gary Files – Phil Wade
 Matthew Robertson – Dr. Harris	
 Annette Kerr – Nurse	
 Edwina Carroll – Leila Carlin	
 Gito Santana – Alien	
 Louisa Rabaiotti – SHADO Operative	
 Penny Spencer – Janis	
 Dennis Plenty – Lt. David Worth	
 Jack Silk – Motorcyclist

Music
An original score was composed for this episode by Barry Gray.

Production notes

During late 1968, Gerry and Sylvia Anderson collaborated with producer Reg Hill and writers Donald James and Tony Barwick to develop the format for the series and the pilot episode Identified. Initially, Earth's defence organisation was to be called UFoeDO – Unidentified Foe Defence Organisation – which was not a secret operation like SHADO was to become.

The commander of UFoeDO was to be a Commander Straeker—later shortened to Straker—with Ed Bishop cast in the role. Second in command was to be Alex Freeman—later named Alec—and played by George Sewell. Both actors had appeared in the Andersons' film Doppelgänger.

Initially the Moonbase Commander, named Franco Desica, was to be played by Italian actor Franco De Rosa. De Rosa was later fired after three days of filming for causing considerable delays. De Rosa's character was dropped entirely from the show. Some of Desica's dialogue was repurposed for a new Moonbase Commander, Lt. Gay Ellis (played by Gabrielle Drake) (this character was initially called Lt. Paula Harris). The captain of the Skydiver craft, cast as Jon Karlin, was to be Jon Kelley, but before filming commenced the part was restructured and offered to dancer Peter Gordeno, and the character renamed Peter Carlin. Jon Kelley was re-cast as Skydiver navigator John Masters.

Towards the end of April 1969, following five months of pre-production, principal photography for the pilot episode began with Gerry Anderson directing at MGM-British Studios in Borehamwood. Second unit filming took place at Burnham Beeches in Buckinghamshire; this included the UFO attack on Straker and Henderson's Rolls-Royce. This unit also filmed the scene with Peter Carlin (Peter Gordeno) and his sister Leila (Edwina Carroll) when they discover a UFO landed in a wood; this was filmed at Black Park at Iver Heath, close to Pinewood Studios.

Additional location shooting included Neptune House at ATV Elstree Studios. This building was used as the administration block for Harlington-Straker Studios. Various SHADO members were filmed arriving at this building. In the episode, Colonel Lake holds a newspaper with the date of 24 August 1980; this details the exact date that SHADO became operational.

Other locations used for the filming included Handley Page Ltd., Radlett Aerodrome, Hertfordshire.

References

External links
 Screenplay for the episode

1970 British television episodes
UFO (TV series) episodes